The 1958 Vermont gubernatorial election took place on November 4, 1958. Incumbent Republican Joseph B. Johnson did not run for re-election to a third term as Governor of Vermont. Republican candidate Robert Stafford defeated Democratic candidate Bernard J. Leddy to succeed him.

Republican primary

Results

Democratic primary

Results

General election

Results

References

Vermont
1958
Gubernatorial
November 1958 events in the United States